The Car Dyke was, and to a large extent still is, an  long ditch which runs along the western edge of the Fens in eastern England. It is generally accepted as being of Roman age and, for many centuries, to have been taken as marking the western edge of the Fens. There, the consensus begins to break down.

Likely purpose
In the eighteenth century, William Stukeley described it as a canal used for transporting goods and his idea is still promulgated: For example, excavations at Waterbeach in the 1990s by the archaeology unit of Cambridgeshire County Council found what were seen as the remains of a Roman-era boat and cargo of pottery from Horningsea. This stretch has been protected as a scheduled monument. Other excavations have found coal from the Midlands in use at a cluster of Roman-era coal-burning forges sited between Cambridge and The Wash and these provide evidence of trade and transport along the Car Dyke. Return cargoes were grain to supply the garrison at York, prepared for transport and storage by drying in coal kilns, and pottery. At its northern end accounts of Roman Britain describe it as an extension of the Foss Dyke, an accepted transport route. Near Morton, Lincolnshire, a boatload of dressed quarry stone, identified with the mediaeval period, has been discovered in the canal bed.

In other parts, however, the topography suggests that its use as a canal was unlikely or at least difficult: the segment which ran, and to some extent still runs, through the Soke of Peterborough rises from the River Nene to a ridge at Eye then falls to the River Welland. This it does in steady gradients, quite unlike the characteristics of a canal designed for transport. Its course makes it clear that this outcome was carefully planned. At some level sections in Lincolnshire it has causeways of never-disturbed ground crossing it and it passes in gradients, up and down the sides of slight ridges. Given the length of the canal, however, modern surveyors suggest that the original engineers may not have been able to keep the canal at a constant level (due to surveying difficulties or lack of budget to excavate deeper). Natural barriers may therefore have been left in place to partition the canal into sections, maintaining the required depth of water, with goods transhipped or boats dragged across the barriers. They may also have been a deliberate precaution against the whole section drying out in summer. Conversely, Grahame Clark established that certain of these gravel causeways, at Cottenham, originated in the fourth century as a precaution against flooding, after the canal had gone out of use for transport.

It acts as a catchwater drain in parts, intercepting runoff from the higher ground to the west: evidence of seventeenth-century improvements to form part of local drainage schemes has been identified, overlying material from the Roman period.  Conversely, the southern half of its passage through Lincolnshire and its northern end, near Washingborough, are accepted as having had a raised bank on each side; the one on the upland side would not be a feature well adapted to a catchwater drain.

Both these interpretations could be correct: Macaulay and Reynolds (1994) suggest that the effect of both deliberate re-cuts in the late Roman period to improve land drainage, and the natural flows of surface water along some sections of the route, resulted in the change of use from transport to agricultural improvement.

It is possible to trace features that could be interpreted as boundaries all round The Fens which are either of Roman date or natural. In c.120 AD the Roman emperor Hadrian visited Britain and the sections dating from this period may be associated with his plan to settle the Fens. The exception is in the south-east of the Fens where the landscape was manually strip mined for phosphate so destroying any evidence, before the days of detailed mapping and aerial photography. One conclusion, though given the conflicts in the surviving evidence one not reached by everyone, is that overall it was used primarily as a boundary, (as part of it in south Lincolnshire undoubtedly was in the medieval period) but that parts were adapted to serve also as a catchwater drain. Although possibly not originally intended as a means of transporting goods, archaeology has demonstrated that, in some parts at least, it was used by cargo-carrying vessels.

In his historical novel Imperial Governor, George Shipway maintains that Gaius Suetonius Paulinus, then governor of Britain, conceived draining the fens as a way of denying Icenian rebels a place to hide.

Route

The northern part of the Car Dyke from Lincoln to Peterborough is reasonably easy to follow. It is marked on the Ordnance Survey map of Roman Britain and was shown on the first edition maps by the Ordnance Survey produced in 1824. Much of it is still marked on the modern 1:25,000 map and the 1:2,500 map. However, the southern section from Peterborough to Waterbeach is not so easy to follow. The 2001 map of Roman Britain shows the dyke from Peterborough terminating to the north of Ramsey, with another isolated section running northwards from Waterbeach on the River Cam. The short section between Waterbeach and the Cam is known as The Old Tillage, a name deriving from a dialect word for loading and unloading.

At the northern end, the first recognisable remains are to the north of the B1190 road through Washingborough, where the south bank runs between gardens and allotments. Material from the north bank was used to construct new banks for the River Witham in the early 19th century, as part of a project to replace the original locks at Kirkstead and Barlings with new locks at Stamp End and Bardney, authorised by an Act of Parliament obtained in 1808. There are then six short sections which are listed as scheduled monuments, with gaps due to the construction of houses and a community centre on the line of the remains. Its course then turns to the south-east, running parallel to the B1190, as it heads through Branston Booths, passing the end of Branston Delph and Carr-Dyke Farm, one of many similarly named farms along its length, to reach Potterhanworth Booths. Much of its route has become part of the modern land-drainage infrastructure, and so the remains are not particularly well preserved.

It then heads broadly southwards across open countryside and forms the eastern boundary of Potterhanworth Wood. In Nocton Fen it passes to the east of the site of Nocton Park Priory, and then there is another scheduled section, bordered to the west by Nocton Wood, and connected to Nocton Delph, which flows eastwards to the River Witham. In Metheringham Fen it turns to the east, and there are two short scheduled section after Blankney Wood, divided by the buildings of Oak Tree Farm. It then resumes its southward passage, and after Carrdyke Farm, there is another scheduled section. It passes to the east of Martin and the western end of Timberland Delph, before following a large S-shaped course to the east of Timberland. Immediately afterwards there are two more scheduled sections, one to the north of Fen Road, Timberland and the second to the south.

The dyke passes to the east of Walcott and along the northern and eastern edge of Billinghay, where it joins Billinghay Skirth, which drains into the River Witham. The continuation of Billinghay Skirth to the south-west uses the course of Car Dyke, and when it turns to the west near North Kyme, Car Dyke continues southwards, running along the western edge of North Kyme to reach the River Slea at Ferry Bridge. The River Slea makes a right-angled turn at the junction, and then turns to the east again, with Car Dyke continuing southwards, and now part of Midfodder Dike. Its course has then been reused by Hodge Dyke, which again makes a right-angled turn at the junction, until it crosses Heckington Eau, which becomes Head Dike as it continues eastwards. Continuing to the south, it reaches Littleworth Drove, where a house has been built over the remains. It passes under the A17 road, and then Carterplot Road runs parallel to it.

At the railway crossing, it turns to the west and then the south west, where there is another scheduled section. It runs to the east of Swaton, with Cardyke Farm to its east, and continues past Horbling and Billingborough until it is crossed by Billingborough Lode, which drains into the South Forty-Foot Drain. There is a large moated site by the junction. Near Pointon, it is crossed by Fen Road, Pointon Lode and Millthorpe Drove, while near Dunsby there is another Car Dyke Farm. Soon its course is joined by Rippingale Running Dike, and between Haconby and Morton there is another Cardyke Farm, before the Car Dyke passes through a small village called Dyke, where there is another scheduled section.

At Bourne the dyke makes right-angled turns to the east and then the south, to join Bourne Eau, which continues westwards to the centre of the town, where the Car Dyke turns to the south and weaves its way between housing. Soon it is back in open countryside, passing to the east of Thurlby where  of earthworks in Park Wood are scheduled, before crossing the River Glen just to the east of Kate's Bridge. Its course is lost as it passes through the housing estates of Baston, as it has in Market Deeping and Deeping St James. As it crosses the River Welland on the southern edge of the town, it passes into Cambridgeshire, and skirts the eastern edges of Northborough and Glinton. As it approaches the northern edge of Peterborough, it turns to the east, where there is another scheduled section at Peakirk, beyond which its course is covered by housing.

From Fen Bridge to Whitepost Road,  of Car Dyke is scheduled, with two small gaps where the course is cut by Guntons Road and Gunthorpe Road. The remains are in good condition, despite the fact that Car Dyke has been reused as part of the modern land drainage system. It then passes through Peterborough  where parts of its course are visible, but much has been obliterated by Frank Perkins Parkway, before it reaches the River Nene.

Fens Waterways Link

The section between the rivers Nene and Welland may be restored to navigation as a section of the new Fens Waterways Link for leisure craft. An engineering study has been made, but because of concerns for its historic status it is not the preferred route, with the Cat's Water Drain being the other considered option.

See also
List of Roman canals

Footnotes

References

External links

 Historic England record

Roman sites in England
Roman canals
Geography of Lincolnshire
Geography of Peterborough
Canals in England
Scheduled monuments in Cambridgeshire
Scheduled monuments in Lincolnshire
Ancient dikes
Archaeological sites in Lincolnshire